In Vain may refer to:

 "In Vain" (Kim-Lian song)
In Vain (Within Temptation song)
 In Vain (band), a Norwegian band
 in vain (Haas), a composition by Georg Friedrich Haas
 An EP by the German band Rage